Alesana Kleis Seluka (MBE, CBE) is medical doctor by profession and is  the Chairman of the Public Service Commission of Tuvalu. He represented the constituency of Nui in the Parliament of Tuvalu. He served as the Minister of Finance and Economic Planning from 1996 until 1999, and Minister of Health from 2001 to 2006 and held other Cabinet posts.

He was made a Member of the Most Excellent Order of the British Empire (MBE), then in 1998 he was made an Ordinary Commander of the Most Excellent Order of the British Empire (CBE) for services to medicine, politics and the community.

Political career
Alesana Seluka was elected to represent Nui and he was returned to parliament in the 1998 Tuvaluan general election.

He was the Minister of Finance and Economic Planning in the 2nd government of Bikenibeu Paeniu (1996 to 1998); and after the 1998 Tuvaluan general election he retained the finance portfolio and was also the Minister for Tourism, Trade and Commerce in the 3rd government of Paeniu, until he resigned as PM following a vote of no confidence on 27 April 1999.

Alesana Seluka was the Minister for Education and Health in the Koloa Talake government (2001–2002).

Alesana Seluka was re-elected in the 2002 Tuvaluan general election; as served as Minister of Health in the government of Saufatu Sopoanga (2002-2004).  and in government of Maatia Toafa (2004–2006).

He was  again elected in the 2006 Tuvaluan general election; however he was not re-elected in the 2010 Tuvaluan general election.

Subsequent career
He was appointed the Chairman of the Public Service Commission of Tuvalu.

References

Living people
Finance Ministers of Tuvalu
Members of the Parliament of Tuvalu
People from Nui (atoll)
Year of birth missing (living people)